7 Light Anti-Aircraft Regiment is a reserve force regiment of the South African Army Air Defence Artillery Formation.

History

Origin
With the reorganisation of the Citizen Force in 1959/60, the headquarters and three independent anti-aircraft batteries were combined into one regiment known as the University of Cape Town Regiment.

The regiment mobilised during the state of emergency during that period and was equipped with 3.7 inch guns.
The regiment was organised with three batteries of two troops each with a radar troop.

7 Light Anti Aircraft  was raised from its mother unit, UCTR, on 1 April 1969, when excess personnel from Cape Garrison Artillery was absorbed.

In 1988, during Operation Packer, 72 Battery supplied air cover at the Chambinga Gorge near Cyuito Cuanavale in Angola.

Command Affiliation
Initially the regiment was assigned to 7 South African Infantry Division, but with the raising of 9 Division, it was transferred to the new organisation.

Regimental Symbols

Previous Dress Insignia

Officers Commanding
 Cmdt. A.J. Stoffberg
 Cmdt. Arthur Henry Morris

Freedom of the City
The regiment received the freedom of Goodwood on 31 March 1990.

References

Military units and formations of South Africa in the Border War
Military units and formations of South Africa
Military units and formations in Cape Town
Military units and formations established in 1969